Anilazine (ǎ-nǐl-a-zēn) is an organic compound with the chemical formula C9H5Cl3N4. It is a pesticide used on crops. It comes under the category of triazine fungicides. It is used for controlling fungus diseases which attack lawns and turf, cereals, coffee, and a wide variety of vegetables and other crops. It is also used for the control of potato and tomato leafspots.

Toxicity 
Oral administration to rats and cats, the most common signs of toxicity were diarrhea and vomiting, respectively. After dermal administration to rabbits, mild skin irritation manifested as edema and erythema was observed. Anilazine was more toxic by intraperitoneal injection than by other routes of administration.

Medical use
In 1955, Bergsmann studied dairin as a tuberculocide.

References

External links

Triazines
Chloroarenes